Gemma Bishop is an actress and singer-songwriter from Australia.

Television credits include Neighbours and Short Cuts.

She was recently nominated for an LA Music Award for her single 'Midnight.'

References

External links
 
 

21st-century Australian actresses
Living people
Place of birth missing (living people)
Year of birth missing (living people)